Narince is a white wine grape grown in Turkey. It is originated from and grows at Tokat province at mid-southern Anatolia in Turkey. Ripening period is the same as Merlot. Harvest is around mid September. When fully ripe, it has striking amber color. Its parents are Kalecik Karasi and Dimrit both of which Anatolian cultivars.

Narince makes usually dry, straw yellow-green color wines with floral notes, sophisticated fruit flavour of yellow fruits of lime, orange, white pineapple, plum, green apple and citrus aromas on the nose. Wines from Narince are medium to full bodied, balanced with good acidity. In cool places, the wines from Narince will have high acidity. It is usually treated with oak.

References 

Grape varieties of Turkey
White wine grape varieties